The El Caso Lookout Complex is located in the Gila National Forest north of Apache Creek,  New Mexico. Built in 1934 by the Works Progress Administration, the complex was one of three New Deal-era forest fire lookouts built in Catron County. The other two are the Mangas Mountain Lookout Complex near Old Horse Springs and the Bearwallow Mountain Lookout Complex near Mogollon.

See also

National Register of Historic Places listings in Catron County, New Mexico

References

Government buildings completed in 1934
Towers completed in 1934
Buildings and structures in Catron County, New Mexico
Government buildings on the National Register of Historic Places in New Mexico
Fire lookout towers on the National Register of Historic Places in New Mexico
Works Progress Administration in New Mexico
Gila National Forest
National Register of Historic Places in Catron County, New Mexico
1934 establishments in New Mexico